Perbadanan Labuan or Labuan Corporation (PL) is a local authority which administrates the Federal Territory of Labuan, Malaysia. This agency is under Ministry of the Federal Territories. PL are responsible for public health and sanitation, waste removal and management, town planning, environmental protection and building control, social and economic development and general maintenance functions of urban infrastructure. The PL main headquarters that is Wisma Perbadanan Labuan located at Jalan Dewan, Bandar Labuan. PL has another office building, Menara Perbadanan Labuan  at Jalan OKK Awang Besar.

History 
Labuan Corporation was established on 1 July 2001 under Act 609, Perbadanan Labuan Act 2001. It is the merger between two agencies, the Labuan Development Authority (LDA) and Labuan Municipal Council (MPL).

Chairman
 Datuk Haji Bashir bin Haji Alias

Organisation chart

Chief Executive Officer 

Tn. Hj. Rithuan bin Hj. Mohd  Ismail (Effective 1 October 2022)

Deputy Chief Executive Officer

Fadzilah bin Hj. Mahmud (Administration)

Ibrahim bin Tambi (Development)

Departments 
  Internal Audit
  Legal Advisor
  Property Management & Assessment
  Administration
  Account & Financial Management
  Human Resource Management
  Art, Culture & Tourism
  Information Management
  Labuan Public Library
  Project & Engineering
  Planning & Building Control
  Township Services
  Socio-Economy Development
  Coordination, Observation, Assessment & Impact Survey
  Department Of Enforcement

See also
 List of local governments in Malaysia

External links 
 PL official web site 
 Perbadanan Labuan Official Facebook Page
 Perbadanan Labuan Official Twitter

Labuan
Labuan
Ministry of Territories (Malaysia)